The Golden Anchor is a 1932 German-French drama film directed by Alexander Korda and starring Albert Bassermann, Ursula Grabley, and Mathias Wieman. It is the German-language version of Marius (1931), based on Marcel Pagnol's play of the same title. Such multi-language versions were common during the early years of sound. It was made at the Joinville Studios by the European branch of Paramount Pictures.

Cast

See also 
 The Black Whale (1934) - A German version of the French sequel Fanny but not a sequel of The Golden Anchor.

References

Bibliography

External links 
 

1932 films
1932 drama films
German drama films
French drama films
Films of the Weimar Republic
1930s German-language films
Films directed by Alexander Korda
Paramount Pictures films
Films shot at Joinville Studios
German multilingual films
Films based on works by Marcel Pagnol
German black-and-white films
1932 multilingual films
1930s German films
1930s French films